The  is a Mini-shinkansen rail line in Japan. Serving the Kantō and Tōhoku Regions of the country, it links Tokyo and Akita in Akita prefecture. From Tokyo to Morioka in Iwate prefecture, it operates on the Tōhoku Shinkansen tracks. From Morioka to Ōmagari, it uses the Tazawako Line tracks. The section from Ōmagari to Akita use the Ōu Main Line tracks.

Operations
Services consist of Komachi trains formed of 7-car E6 series mini-shinkansen sets coupled with E5 series Hayabusa trains for the portion of the journey between Tokyo and Morioka.

The line from Morioka to Akita is prone to deep snow.

Stations
Between Tokyo and Morioka, the stations are the same as those on the Tohoku Shinkansen. From there on, the stations are as shown below.

History
 March 22, 1997:  The segment from Morioka to Akita began operating with 5-car E3 series trains.
 1998: Trains were extended to 6 cars.
 September 16, 2001: line celebrates 10 millionth passenger.
 March 11, 2006: line celebrates 20 millionth passenger.
 March 18, 2007: All cars are made no smoking.
 March 11, 2011: All services suspended due to the Tohoku earthquake and tsunami.
 March 18, 2011: Partial service resumes between Morioka and Akita. No through service to Tōhoku Shinkansen.
 April 29, 2011: In conjunction with the reopening of the full length of the Tohoku Shinkansen, through service to Tokyo is restored.
 July 22, 2017: All services between Ōmagari and Akita suspended due to flooding after heavy rain falls
 July 29, 2017: Service resumes.
February 13, 2021: Services suspended north of Nasushiobara Station due to the 2021 Fukushima earthquake.

Rolling stock
As of March 2020, the following types are used on Akita Shinkansen services.

 E6 series 7-car sets, since 16 March 2013

Former rolling stock

 E3 series 6-car sets (originally 5-car sets) withdrawn by 15 March 2014

Non-revenue-earning-types

 East i (E926)

References

 JR Timetable, June 2009 issue

 
Lines of East Japan Railway Company
High-speed railway lines in Japan
Standard gauge railways in Japan
Railway lines opened in 1997
1997 establishments in Japan